Main Tower is a 56-storey,  skyscraper in the Innenstadt district of Frankfurt, Germany. It is named after the nearby Main river. The building is  when its antenna spire is included.

The tower has five underground floors and two public viewing platforms. It is the only skyscraper in Frankfurt with a public viewing observatory. It is the 4th tallest building in Frankfurt and the 4th tallest in Germany, tied with Tower 185.

The foyer of the building has two art pieces accessible to the public: the video installation by Bill Viola "The World of Appearances" and the wall mosaic by Stephan Huber "Frankfurter Treppe / XX. Jahrhundert" ( "Frankfurt's Steps/20th century").

The tower's design features what appears to be two connected towers. The smaller of the two is of a cuboid shape and a design common to 1970s architecture. The second and taller of the two towers is a circular tower with an entire blue glass exterior which features the transmission tower on top.

History
The structure was built between 1996 and 1999, and serves as headquarters for Landesbank Hessen-Thüringen (Helaba). Other tenants are the German Offices of Merrill Lynch and Standard & Poor's and a television studio of the Hessischer Rundfunk. Prominent US law firms Sullivan & Cromwell and Cleary Gottlieb Steen & Hamilton are also residents of the Main Tower. The first tenants moved in on 5 November 1999, and the official inauguration was 28 January 2000. During weather reports by the television station, the weather reporter stands on the top of the building.

In June 2015 NorthStar Realty Finance of New York entered into an agreement to acquire Main Tower for about €540 million.

Skyscrapers in Frankfurt

See also
 List of tallest buildings in Frankfurt
 List of tallest buildings in Germany
 List of tallest buildings in the European Union
 List of tallest buildings in Europe

References

External links 

 The official website in English

Office buildings completed in 1999
Skyscrapers in Frankfurt
Bankenviertel
Skyscraper office buildings in Germany
1999 establishments in Germany